FC Hirnyk-Sport Horishni Plavni is a Ukrainian football club based in Horishni Plavni, Poltava Oblast. The club competes in the First League.

The club is sponsored by Ferrexpo.

History

The club was founded in 1989. After some above average performances in the KFK 3rd Zone (Central Ukraine) Amateur Championship the club's administration decided to enter the professional league. However, at this level the club has continually struggled and has had only 2 winning seasons since entering this level of competition.

The club plays its football games at "Yunist" (Youth) Stadium. According to the Vorskla website the stadium has a capacity of 5,000 spectators, while the website of Hirnyk reports a mere 2,500.

The club was promoted to the Ukrainian First League for the first time in 2014.

Team names
{|class="wikitable"
|-bgcolor="#efefef"
|Year
|Name
|-
|1989–92
|Lokomotiv
|-
|1993–95
|Hirnyk
|-
|1995–
|Hirnyk-Sport
|}

Honors

Ukrainian Druha Liha: 1
 2013–14 Champions

 Finalist of the League Cup 2009–10

League and cup history
{|class="wikitable"
|-bgcolor="#efefef"
! Season
! Div.
! Pos.
! Pl.
! W
! D
! L
! GS
! GA
! P
!Domestic Cup
!colspan=2|Other
!Notes
|-bgcolor=SteelBlue
|align=center|1992–93
|align=center rowspan=3|4th(Amatorska Liha)
|align=center|
|align=center|
|align=center|
|align=center|
|align=center|
|align=center|
|align=center|
|align=center|
|align=center|
|align=center|
|align=center|
|align=center|
|-bgcolor=SteelBlue
|align=center|1993–94
|align=center|
|align=center|
|align=center|
|align=center|
|align=center|
|align=center|
|align=center|
|align=center|
|align=center|
|align=center|
|align=center|
|align=center|
|-bgcolor=SteelBlue
|align=center|1994–95
|align=center|
|align=center|
|align=center|
|align=center|
|align=center|
|align=center|
|align=center|
|align=center|
|align=center|
|align=center|
|align=center|
|align=center|
|-bgcolor=PowderBlue
|align=center|1995–96
|align=center rowspan=20|3rd(Druha Liha)
|align=center|16
|align=center|38
|align=center|10
|align=center|8
|align=center|20
|align=center|33
|align=center|71
|align=center|38
|align=center|Did not enter
|align=center|
|align=center|
|align=center|
|-bgcolor=PowderBlue
|align=center|1996–97
|align=center|14
|align=center|32
|align=center|10
|align=center|6
|align=center|16
|align=center|20
|align=center|32
|align=center|36
|align=center|1st Qual. round
|align=center|
|align=center|
|align=center|
|-bgcolor=PowderBlue
|align=center|1997–98
|align=center|4
|align=center|32
|align=center|12
|align=center|11
|align=center|9
|align=center|39
|align=center|35
|align=center|47
|align=center|3rd Qual. round
|align=center|
|align=center|
|align=center|
|-bgcolor=PowderBlue
|align=center|1998–99
|align=center|4
|align=center|26
|align=center|13
|align=center|6
|align=center|7
|align=center|36
|align=center|31
|align=center|41
|align=center|1st Qual. round
|align=center|
|align=center|
|align=center|
|-bgcolor=PowderBlue
|align=center|1999–00
|align=center|7
|align=center|26
|align=center|10
|align=center|5
|align=center|11
|align=center|33
|align=center|41
|align=center|35
|align=center|DNQ
|align=center|2L
|align=center| finals
|align=center|
|-bgcolor=PowderBlue
|align=center|2000–01
|align=center|10
|align=center|28
|align=center|9
|align=center|4
|align=center|15
|align=center|26
|align=center|45
|align=center|31
|align=center|DNQ
|align=center|2L
|align=center| finals
|align=center|
|-bgcolor=PowderBlue
|align=center|2001–02
|align=center|17
|align=center|34
|align=center|6
|align=center|6
|align=center|22
|align=center|32
|align=center|60
|align=center|24
|align=center|1st round
|align=center|
|align=center|
|align=center|
|-bgcolor=PowderBlue
|align=center|2002–03
|align=center|15
|align=center|30
|align=center|7
|align=center|6
|align=center|17
|align=center|27
|align=center|48
|align=center|27
|align=center| finals
|align=center|
|align=center|
|align=center|
|-bgcolor=PowderBlue
|align=center|2003–04
|align=center|14
|align=center|30
|align=center|10
|align=center|5
|align=center|15
|align=center|40
|align=center|40
|align=center|35
|align=center| finals
|align=center|
|align=center|
|align=center|
|-bgcolor=PowderBlue
|align=center|2004–05
|align=center|9
|align=center|28
|align=center|10
|align=center|0
|align=center|18
|align=center|35
|align=center|49
|align=center|30
|align=center| finals
|align=center|
|align=center|
|align=center|Group C
|-bgcolor=PowderBlue
|align=center|2005–06
|align=center|8
|align=center|24
|align=center|10
|align=center|4
|align=center|10
|align=center|30
|align=center|31
|align=center|34
|align=center| finals
|align=center|
|align=center|
|align=center|Group C
|-bgcolor=PowderBlue
|align=center|2006–07
|align=center|15
|align=center|28
|align=center|5
|align=center|2
|align=center|21
|align=center|23
|align=center|48
|align=center|17
|align=center| finals
|align=center|
|align=center|
|align=center|
|-bgcolor=PowderBlue
|align=center|2007–08
|align=center|15
|align=center|34
|align=center|9
|align=center|7
|align=center|18
|align=center|38
|align=center|59
|align=center|34
|align=center| finals
|align=center|
|align=center|
|align=center|
|-bgcolor=PowderBlue
|align=center|2008–09
|align=center|13
|align=center|34
|align=center|9
|align=center|8
|align=center|17
|align=center|28
|align=center|45
|align=center|35
|align=center| finals
|align=center|
|align=center|
|align=center|
|-bgcolor=PowderBlue
|align=center|2009–10
|align=center|11
|align=center|26
|align=center|5
|align=center|7
|align=center|14
|align=center|21
|align=center|35
|align=center|22
|align=center| finals
|align=center|LC
|align=center bgcolor=silver|Final
|align=center|
|-bgcolor=PowderBlue
|align=center|2010–11
|align=center|9
|align=center|22
|align=center|6
|align=center|4
|align=center|12
|align=center|17
|align=center|29
|align=center|22
|align=center| finals
|align=center|
|align=center|
|align=center|
|-bgcolor=PowderBlue
|align=center|2011–12
|align=center|9
|align=center|26
|align=center|6
|align=center|8
|align=center|12
|align=center|28
|align=center|39
|align=center|26
|align=center| finals
|align=center|
|align=center|
|align=center|
|-bgcolor=PowderBlue
|align=center rowspan="2"|2012–13
|align=center|11
|align=center|24 	
|align=center|5 	 	
|align=center|3 			 	 	
|align=center|16 		
|align=center|25 			 	
|align=center|50 		 	 	
|align=center|18
|align=center rowspan=2| finals
|align=center|
|align=center|
|align=center|qualified to relegation group 4
|-bgcolor=PowderBlue
|align=center|3
|align=center|8	 	
|align=center|5 		
|align=center|1 	
|align=center|2				
|align=center|14 	 		
|align=center|7 		 	 	
|align=center|16
|align=center|
|align=center|
|align=center|
|-bgcolor=PowderBlue
|align=center|2013–14
|align=center bgcolor=gold|1
|align=center|36
|align=center|25
|align=center|4
|align=center|7
|align=center|68
|align=center|31
|align=center|79
|align=center| finals
|align=center|
|align=center|
|align=center bgcolor=lightgreen|Promoted
|-bgcolor=LightCyan
|align=center|2014–15
|align=center rowspan=7|2nd(Persha Liha)
|align=center bgcolor=tan|3
|align=center|30
|align=center|16
|align=center|9
|align=center|5
|align=center|44
|align=center|24
|align=center|57
|align=center| finals
|align=center|
|align=center|
|align=center|
|-bgcolor=LightCyan
|align=center|2015–16
|align=center|12
|align=center|30 	
|align=center|8 	
|align=center|9 	
|align=center|13 	
|align=center|30 	
|align=center|35
|align=center|33
|align=center| finals
|align=center|
|align=center|
|align=center|
|-bgcolor=LightCyan
|align=center|2016–17
|align=center|11
|align=center| 	34 	
|align=center| 12 	
|align=center|7 	 	
|align=center|15 	 	
|align=center|47 		
|align=center|54 	
|align=center|43
|align=center| finals
|align=center|
|align=center|
|align=center|
|-bgcolor=LightCyan
|align=center|2017–18
|align=center|8
|align=center| 	34
|align=center| 16  
|align=center|2 
|align=center|16  
|align=center|30
|align=center|40       
|align=center|50
|align=center| finals
|align=center|
|align=center|
|align=center|
|-bgcolor=LightCyan
|align=center|2018–19
|align=center|12
|align=center|28
|align=center|5
|align=center|12
|align=center|11
|align=center|24
|align=center|43
|align=center|27
|align=center| finals
|align=center|
|align=center|
|align=center|
|-bgcolor=LightCyan
|align=center|2019–20
|align=center|9
|align=center|30 	
|align=center|12 	
|align=center|3 	
|align=center|15 	
|align=center|42 	
|align=center|48 	 
|align=center|39
|align=center| finals
|align=center|
|align=center|
|align=center|
|-bgcolor=LightCyan
|align=center|2020–21
|align=center|9
|align=center|30 	
|align=center|11 	
|align=center|5 	
|align=center|14 	
|align=center|43 	
|align=center|45 	 
|align=center|38 
|align=center| finals
|align=center|
|align=center|
|align=center|
|}

Players

Current squad

Out on loan

Managers
 Ihor Zhabchenko (2013–2016)
 Serhiy Puchkov (2016 – 31 Dec 2018)
 Volodymyr Mazyar (1 Jan 2019 – 9 Sept 2019)
 Ihor Zhabchenko (15 Sept 2019 – present)

References

External links
 Official website

 
Hirnyk-Sport Komsomolsk
Association football clubs established in 1989
1989 establishments in Ukraine
Hirnyk-Sport Komsomolsk
Football clubs in the Ukrainian Soviet Socialist Republic
Horishni Plavni
Mining association football teams in Ukraine